Tamás Lévai is a Hungarian Greco-Roman wrestler. He won one of the bronze medals in the 82 kg event at the 2022 World Wrestling Championships held in Belgrade, Serbia. He also won one of the bronze medals in the 82 kg event at the 2022 European Wrestling Championships held in Budapest, Hungary.

Achievements

References

External links 
 

Living people
Year of birth missing (living people)
Place of birth missing (living people)
Hungarian male sport wrestlers
European Wrestling Championships medalists
World Wrestling Championships medalists
21st-century Hungarian people